Koriand'r is a character appearing in DC comicics.

Koriand'r may also refer to:

 "Koriand'r" (Titans episode)
 Koriand'r (Titans character)